Vemundvik is a former municipality in the old Nord-Trøndelag county, Norway. The  municipality existed from 1838 until its dissolution in 1964 (although it was originally much larger in 1838). By 1964, the municipality roughly corresponded to the mainland areas north of the river Namsen in what is now the municipality of Namsos in Trøndelag county. From 1838 until about 1942, the administrative centre was the village of Vemundvik where Vemundvik Church is located. After 1941, the municipal offices and administration was headquartered in the town of Namsos (which was technically not part of the municipality).

History

The municipality of Vemundvik was established on 1 January 1838 (see formannskapsdistrikt law). In 1846, the village of Namsos was declared to be a ladested, which mean that it was split from the municipality of Vemundvik. The new town (Ladested Namsos) had 591 inhabitants and the rest of Vemundvik was called Namsos herred or Namsos landdistrikt and it had 908 residents after the split.

On 1 January 1891, the municipality of Namsos herred was divided again. The southern district of the municipality (population: 1,387) became the new municipality of Klingen and the northern district (population: 1,088) became the new municipality of Vemundvik (bringing back the old name).

Areas of Vemundvik lying adjacent to the town of Namsos were later annexed by the town on numerous occasions. On 1 January 1882, an area with 109 inhabitants was moved to the town. On 1 July 1921 an area with 927 inhabitants was again transferred to Namsos. Then, on 1 July 1957, another area with a population of 6 was transferred to Namsos.

During the 1960s, there were many municipal mergers across Norway due to the work of the Schei Committee. On 1 January 1964, the neighboring municipalities of Vemundvik (population: 2,040) and Klinga (population: 2,482) plus the parts of Otterøy municipality located north of the Namsenfjorden (population: 1,013) and the Finnangerodden area on the island of Otterøya in Fosnes municipality (population: 116) were all merged with the town of Namsos (population: 5,224) to create a new (much larger) municipality of Namsos with 10,875 residents.

Name
The municipality (originally the parish) is named after the old Vemundvik farm since the first Vemundvik Church was built there. The first element is an old male name  or the more modern version, Vemund.

Government
While it existed, this municipality was responsible for primary education (through 10th grade), outpatient health services, senior citizen services, unemployment, social services, zoning, economic development, and municipal roads. During its existence, this municipality was governed by a municipal council of elected representatives, which in turn elected a mayor.

Municipal council
The municipal council  of Vemundvik was made up of 13 representatives that were elected to four year terms. The party breakdown of the final municipal council was as follows:

Mayors
The mayors of Vemundvik:

 1891–1893: Anton Ganæs (V)
 1894–1904: Normann Nilsen (V)
 1905–1919: Johan Hals (V)
 1920–1922: Neumann Thorsen (Ap/NSA)
 1923–1928: Johan Lervik (Bp)
 1929–1934: Amund Grande (Bp)
 1935–1937: Jarle Hildrum (Bp)
 1938–1941: Olav Benum (V)
 1942–1945: Wilhelm Hals (NS)
 1945-1945: Olav Benum (V)
 1946–1947: Peder Myrvold (Ap)
 1948–1951: Jarle Hildrum (Bp)
 1951–1963: Peder Myrvold (Ap)

See also
List of former municipalities of Norway

References

Namsos
Former municipalities of Norway
1838 establishments in Norway
1964 disestablishments in Norway